Storebrand is a financial services company in Norway. By volume, the company's main activities are related to life insurance and pension savings. However, the company also has major divisions working on investments, banking and, until 1999 and again since 2006, P&C insurance products. Through its acquisition of Swedish SPP from Handelsbanken in 2007, Storebrand gained a sizable division dedicated to the Swedish market for life insurance.

The company's headquarters are located in Lysaker in the municipality of Bærum, just outside Oslo, Norway.

Storebrand is a public company listed on the Oslo Stock Exchange. The company CEO is Odd Arild Grefstad.

Storebrand issues an annual report for companies engaging in socially responsible investments.

History
The company traces its roots back to 1767 when Den almindelige Brand-Forsikrings-Anstalt, later Norges Brannkasse, was formed.

In 1982 Storebrand merged with its competitor, insurance company Norden, to form the Storebrand-Norden group. The company changed its name to AS Storebrand in 1986.

In 1991 Storebrand merged with the companies under the UNI Forsikring trademark (Norges Brannkasse and Norske Folk), to become UNI Storebrand. Later attempts to acquire Swedish insurance company Skandia, together with Danish company Hafnia and Finnish company Pohjola, to form a large Nordic insurance company under Norwegian leadership, failed in 1992. This caused the share prices of UNI Storebrand to plummet and the government took control of the company. In 1993 the company successfully managed to restructure its debt and was again made available for trading on the Oslo Stock Exchange.

In 1996 the company changed its name to Storebrand ASA, and was granted governmental concession to operate banking services through its fully owned subsidiary Storebrand Bank.

The following year, attempts to merge with Christiania Bank og Kreditkasse, now part of Nordea, failed as Storebrand did not achieve the necessary ⅔ majority for the merger from its shareholders. 63,38 percent voted for.

In 1999 Storebrand merged its P&C insurance division with similar divisions of Skandia and Pohjola to form If P&C Insurance, in which Storebrand retained an ownership share of 33 percent. The shares were later sold, a natural consequence of Storebrand starting a new P&C insurance division to become a competitor of If, while If also became a competitor of Storebrand by selling health insurance and certain pension plans.

See also
List of oldest companies

References

External links
Official site in English
Storebrand Norwegian website

Financial services companies established in 1767
Banks of Norway
Insurance companies of Norway
Financial services companies of Norway
1767 establishments in Norway
Companies based in Oslo
Companies listed on the Oslo Stock Exchange